The Chief Rabbi of the United Hebrew Congregations of Great Britain and the Commonwealth is the senior rabbi of the United Synagogue, a union of British Orthodox Jewish synagogues.

As of 2013, the chief rabbi is Ephraim Mirvis.

See also
 Chief Rabbi
 British Jews
 List of Chief Rabbis of the United Hebrew Congregations

References

External links
Office of the Chief Rabbi (OCR) 

Jewish British history
British rabbis
Chief rabbis of the United Kingdom
1704 establishments in the British Empire